Ambleny is a commune in the department of Aisne in the Hauts-de-France region of northern France.

Geography
Ambleny is located 8 km west of Soissons and 20 km east of Compiègne.  Route National N31 passes through the northern part of the commune between those two cities with an exit to the D943 road which runs south to the town.  The D17 road also runs from Fontenoy in the north to the town then continues south to Coeuvres-et-Valsery.  The D1631 road also runs from the town southeast to join the D94 road at the southern tip of the commune.  There are a number of hamlets in addition to the town: Le Soulier, Montaigu, Hignieres, and Le Rollet.  The northern part of the commune is mixed forest and farmland while the southern portion is entirely farmland.

The Ru de Retz waterway forms part of the south-western boundary of the commune before flowing north through the town and continuing to the river Aisne just north of the commune as it flows west to join the Oise at Compiègne. The Quenneton stream joins the Ru de Retz south of the town at the commune boundary from the west.

Neighbouring communes and villages

History
The former hamlets of Fosse-en-Haut and Fosse-en-Bas served as the starting point for several French units (including the 418th Infantry Regimanet) during the Second Battle of the Marne on 18 July 1918.

Administration

List of Mayors of Ambleny

Population

Distribution of age groups
Percentage distribution of age groups in Ambleny and Aisne Department in 2017

Sources: INSEE

Sites and monuments

The Keep of Ambleny (12th century) is registered as an historical monument.
The Church of Saint Martin (12th century) is registered as an historical monument. The church contains several items that are registered as historical objects:
A Fresco: Vision of Saint Hubert (15th century)
The Funeral Plaque of Antoinette Rousin (1734)
The Funeral Plaque of the Priest Louis Brayer (1724)
A Statue: Saint Sebastian (16th century)
A Statue: Saint Paul (16th century)
A Statue: Saint Martin (16th century)
A Statue: Christ of Pity (16th century)
A Statue: Virgin of Sorrow (16th century)
A Baptismal font (18th century)
A Tombstone (14th century)
A Stained glass window (16th century)
The Lavoir (Public Laundry) in Maubrun

Notable people linked to the commune
Pierre Antoine Poiteau, botanist and horticulturist

See also
 Communes of the Aisne department

References

External links
40000 Bell Towers website 
Ambleny on Géoportail, National Geographic Institute (IGN) website 
Ambleny on the 1750 Cassini Map

Communes of Aisne
Suessiones